The 1975–76 season was the 52nd season in the existence of AEK Athens F.C. and the 17th consecutive season in the top flight of Greek football. They competed in the Alpha Ethniki, the Greek Cup and the UEFA Cup. The season began on 17 September 1975 and finished on 23 May 1976.

Overview

In the summer of 1975, Loukas Barlos, setting aside everything else, threw himself into the acquisition of Thomas Mavros. The 21-year-old striker of Panionios had dazzled everyone with his talent and had decided that it was time to move on to one of the greats of the league. Barlos, according to his favorite strategy, was in favor of the proper gallant player in his offer, but Panionios was blocking the transfer. The president of AEK approached Mavros and convinced him immediately, showing his love for AEK and football. Mavros pushed for the transfer, but collided with a relentless attitude of Panionios. A legal dispute began, based on a finding of Thomas's brother and his lawyer that had to do with their father's unsigned consent when the minor Thomas first joined Panionios. The ending of this dispute came a year later after the out-of-court settlement between the two clubs, with Mavros paying the price of a complete absence of one year from the stadiums, recalling the respective case of Nestoridis several years ago. Fadrhonc's work in the football department was becoming effective, creating a team that combined spectacle and results.

After two consecutive years of absence from the European competitions, AEK returned in the UEFA Cup. The draw brought them against the Yugoslav Vojvodina. The first match took place at Karađorđe Stadium and ended 0–0. Fantronk's team confirmed their superiority and took the victory and the qualification with a score of 3–1. In the second round, the draw brought AEK against the Czechoslovak Inter Bratislava. In the first match at Bratislava, AEK faced defeat by 2–0 In the rematch at Nea Filadelfeia the Czechoslovaks "froze" the stadium opening the score at the 2nd minute and the task of AEK became even more difficult. The Union managed to turn the tie by scoring three goals in the second half, but unfortunately the fourth goal that would send them to the next round did not occur. In the league, AEK remained undefeated for 23 consecutive games and reached seven matches before the finish holding their luck in their own hands. Unfortunately, in the next two matches they suffered an equal number of defeats from Panathinaikos and Aris and in combination with the defeat from PAOK, they finished at second place, 5 points from the top, handing over the title to PAOK. Characteristic was the aggression that Fadrhonc gave to team's playing style which resulted in Georgios Dedes as the league's top scorer with 15 goals, while in the top 10 were also Walter Wagner and Mimis Papaioannou by 11 goals each. In the Greek Cup, AEK reached the semi-finals, where they lost 2–3 and were eliminated by Olympiacos.

Players

Squad information

NOTE: The players are the ones that have been announced by the AEK Athens' press release. No edits should be made unless a player arrival or exit is announced. Updated 30 June 1976, 23:59 UTC+3.

Transfers

In

Out

Renewals

Overall transfer activity

Expenditure:  ₯0

Income:  ₯0

Net Total:  ₯0

Pre-season and friendlies

Alpha Ethniki

League table

Results summary

Results by Matchday

Fixtures

Greek Cup

Matches

UEFA Cup

First round

Second round

Statistics

Squad statistics

! colspan="11" style="background:#FFDE00; text-align:center" | Goalkeepers
|-

! colspan="11" style="background:#FFDE00; color:black; text-align:center;"| Defenders
|-

! colspan="11" style="background:#FFDE00; color:black; text-align:center;"| Midfielders
|-

! colspan="11" style="background:#FFDE00; color:black; text-align:center;"| Forwards
|-

|}

Disciplinary record

|-
! colspan="17" style="background:#FFDE00; text-align:center" | Goalkeepers

|-
! colspan="17" style="background:#FFDE00; color:black; text-align:center;"| Defenders

|-
! colspan="17" style="background:#FFDE00; color:black; text-align:center;"| Midfielders

|-
! colspan="17" style="background:#FFDE00; color:black; text-align:center;"| Forwards

|}

References

External links
AEK Athens F.C. Official Website

AEK Athens F.C. seasons
AEK Athens